The Ven.  Richard Lane Freer was  Archdeacon of Hereford from 1852 to 1863.

He was educated at Christ Church, Oxford. After a curacy in Handsworth he held incumbencies at Mansel Lacy and Bishopstone-cum-Yazor.

He died on 11 August 1863.

Notes

Alumni of Christ Church, Oxford
Archdeacons of Hereford
1863 deaths
Year of birth missing